Anti-Estonian sentiment generally describes dislike or hate of the Estonian people or the Republic of Estonia and is typically propagated by the Russian government and media.

The Russian Anti-Estonian sentiment in 2007

Christopher Walker and Robert Orttung allege that Kremlin-controlled sectors of the Russian media took advantage of anti-Estonian sentiment during Estonia's 2007 relocation of the Bronze Soldier, a Soviet-era monument to Russia's victory over Germany in the Second World War, originally called "Monument to the Liberators of Tallinn". At various times following Estonia's independence from the Soviet Union, Russian national television has effectively shaped anti-Estonian sentiment with the state-controlled media redoubling their anti-Estonian campaign after specific events that displease Moscow.

According to Lilia Shevtsova, Senior Associate at the Russian Domestic Politics and Political Institutions Program Chair of the Carnegie Moscow Center, anti-Estonian sentiment was intentionally escalated by Kremlin in its "search for enemies", however she also notes that even Russian democrats took Estonia's removal of the statue immediately before Victory Day to be an affront to the Russian national honour.

The Russian government used its state controlled media to propagate anti-Estonian sentiment in order to encourage ethnic Russian outrage, leading to coordinated waves of cyber attacks against Estonian internet infrastructure. The President of Estonia Toomas Hendrik Ilves stated at the time: "We are witnesses to the information war against Estonia which already reminds of an ideological aggression".

An anti-Estonian pejorative neologism, eSStonia, appeared in the Russian media, on Runet, and at the street protests in the midst of the Bronze Soldier controversy in 2007. The term, a portmanteau of Estonia and SS, is intended to portray Estonia as a neo-Nazi state.

In April 2007, some participants protested outside the Embassy of Estonia in Moscow, organized by the Russian youth organisation Nashi, carrying signs stating "Wanted. The Ambassador of the Fascist State of eSStonia", referring to the then-Ambassador of Estonia to Russia Marina Kaljurand. In May 2007, members of the Young Guard of United Russia picketed the Consulate-General of Estonia in Saint Petersburg holding up pickets with slogans such as "eSStonia–the shame of Europe!". The use of eSStonia in protests by Nashi and the Young Guard determined the head of the Saint Petersburg youth branch of Yabloko to file a complaint with Yury Chaika, the Prosecutor General of Russia, asking for an investigation into a possible breach of Article 282: Incitement of National, Racial, or Religious Enmity of the Criminal Code of Russia.

In November 2007, Komsomolskaya Pravda, the biggest selling daily newspaper in Russia, ran a campaign asking readers to boycott travel to Estonia, Estonian goods and services. The campaign run under the slogan "I don't go to eSStonia". The Economist, in its editorial, called the term "a cheap jibe" by spelling the country's name eSStonia, President Ilves as IlveSS and Prime Minister Ansip as AnSSip, while noting the coining of the term Nashism to describe what they regard as the populist, pro-authoritarian and ultra-nationalist philosophy of Nashi, a pro-Kremlin youth movement, as an encouraging countermeasure.

In 2007, as a response to the possibility of removal of World War II graves (in the context of the Bronze Soldier controversy) Russian State Duma issued a statement accusing "the Estonian government's intention to continue its course of representing Nazism in a heroic light and justifying its ideology".
In Russia, the youth movement Nashi has been noted for anti-Estonian sentiments among its members; often, framed as "anti-fascism activities".

See also
 Anti-Russian sentiment
 Estonia–Russia relations

References

External links
 Sveriges Radio/Komsomolskaya Pravda May 11, 2007: Anti Estonian hysteria in northwest Russia (article contains incorrect translation from Russian)

 
Estonia
Estonia–Russia relations
Racism